First Baptist Church was designed by Harry Wild Jones and was built in 1910. It served as a church until 2006.  It was added to the National Register of Historic Places in 2008 for its architectural significance.

It is described as "Gothic Revival inspired" and as "Craftsman influenced".  It is a one-story church on a  plan, with a square bell tower over its main entrance, and with an unusual polygonal rotunda at its west end.  The rotunda area provided space for six separable classroom spaces, consistent with Akron Plan design.

This original site of First Baptist Church of Osceola is now owned and operated by River Group Financial, who made significant renovations to the building in the Summer of 2017.

The church, formerly named First Baptist Church of Osceola, moved to a new location in Osceola and changed its name to Grace Church. Grace Church owns and operates a childcare business out of their new building named Above All Beginnings Childcare. Due to the nature of the business operating daily in their building on Hwy. M (722 Seminole Ave, Osceola, WI), their pastor's office is located off-site. The office of the pastor of Grace Church is located in the basement of the original First Baptist Church. River Group Financial owns and leases office space in their newly remodeled building. One other business (Coffee Bark) also rents office space in the River Group Financial building.

References

Churches on the National Register of Historic Places in Wisconsin
Baptist churches in Wisconsin
Gothic Revival church buildings in Wisconsin
Buildings and structures in Polk County, Wisconsin
National Register of Historic Places in Polk County, Wisconsin
Churches completed in 1910